The subcontrabass tuba is a rare instrument of the tuba family built an octave or more below the modern contrabass tuba. Only a very small number of these giant novelty instruments have ever been built. Most are pitched in 36’ BBB♭ an octave lower than the BB♭ contrabass tuba, its fundamental B♭ corresponding to a practically inaudible 15 Hz.

History
The first instrument of this sort was designed by Parisian instrument maker Adolphe Sax.

An instrument built by French instrument maker Gustave Auguste Besson was brought to the United States by Carl Fischer on the suggestion of American bandmaster Patrick Gilmore, who planned to tour with it in 1893. The only surviving playable example, it is now owned by the Harvard University Band who have restored it and feature it occasionally in their concerts.

In 1956, British musician Gerard Hoffnung used a 32’ C subcontrabass tuba built in 1899 in the first of his comedic Hoffnung Music Festivals. He commissioned a work for it, Variations on "Annie Laurie" by Gordon Jacob, which he then performed in the festival. A tuba pitched in FFF was made in Kraslice by Bohland & Fuchs, probably during 1910 or 1911; it was destined for the World Exhibition in New York in 1913. This tuba is "playable" but two players are needed: one to operate the valves, and one to blow into the mouthpiece. Finally, Dr. Frederick Young plays a King BB♭ tuba that was converted into a double tuba (in BB♭ and EEE (natural)) by Dietrich Kleine-Horst (of the Herbert Gronitz Brass Instrument Company in Hamburg, Germany) in 1990. The BB♭ side is a contrabass tuba, and the EEE side is a subcontrabass tuba.

Other examples exist with non-functional valve tubing to provide the look of a tuba, but are essentially giant bugles with a single harmonic series. One built by Besson survives at the Horniman Museum in London, after spending several decades as the shop sign for Boosey & Hawkes. Another built by Bohland & Fuchs in 1912 for Carl Fischer is nick-named "Big Carl" and still owned by Carl Fischer Music.

See also
 Tuba

References

Tubas
B-flat instruments